Angie Lee Bainbridge, OAM (born 16 October 1989) is an Australian freestyle swimmer who specialises in the 200-metre event.

At the 2008 Australian Swimming Championships she qualified for the 2008 Summer Olympics in Beijing as a member of the 4×100-metre and 4×200-metre freestyle relay squads by coming sixth and third in the respective individual events.

She was not used as the Australians won bronze in the shorter race. She then swam the preliminary heats of the longer relay, and collected gold when the first-choice quartet won the final in a world record time.

In 2009, she received the Medal of the Order of Australia "For service to sport as a gold medallist at the Beijing 2008 Olympic Games".

She was part of the Australian  freestyle team at the 2012 Summer Olympics, again swimming in the heats.

She was an Australian Institute of Sport scholarship holder.

See also
 List of Olympic medalists in swimming (women)

References

People from New South Wales
Swimmers at the 2008 Summer Olympics
Swimmers at the 2012 Summer Olympics
Olympic swimmers of Australia
Olympic gold medalists for Australia
Living people
Australian female freestyle swimmers
World Aquatics Championships medalists in swimming
Recipients of the Medal of the Order of Australia
Australian Institute of Sport swimmers
1989 births
Olympic silver medalists for Australia
Medalists at the FINA World Swimming Championships (25 m)
Medalists at the 2012 Summer Olympics
Medalists at the 2008 Summer Olympics
Olympic gold medalists in swimming
Olympic silver medalists in swimming
21st-century Australian women